Wildwater Kingdom may refer to:
Dorney Park & Wildwater Kingdom, an amusement park/water park in Allentown, Pennsylvania
Wildwater Kingdom (Ohio), a defunct water park in Aurora, Ohio
Wet'n'Wild Toronto, a water park in Brampton, Ontario, Canada, formerly an independent water park known as Wild Water Kingdom
Wild Water Kingdom (album), an album by Himanshu Suri

See also
 Wild Water (disambiguation)